The World War I Service Medal issued by New York State in the United States is a World War I service medal designed by Captain Charles Joseph Dieges after being selected from over 100 submitted designs. His firm, Dieges & Clust, also manufactured the medals. Over 500,000 New Yorkers served in World War I and were eligible for this medal.

Criteria

Over 500,000 New Yorkers served in the war, of whom 13,956 lost their lives, and 25 of whom received the nation's highest honor, the Medal of Honor. New York regiments included the 69th Infantry Regiment, known as the "Fighting 69th," and the 369th Infantry Regiment, the first African-American regiment to serve in combat in the war.

Most World War I Army service records were destroyed in a 1973 National Personnel Records Center fire. However, information for New York State was preserved because New York's Adjutant General gathered the information shortly after the war.

Clarification

In 1921, clarification was provided by Charles Damon Newton, New York State Attorney General that the medal was to be awarded for military but not civilian service.

Design

Dieges's design was accepted by a committee consisting of New York State Governor Alfred Emanuel Smith, New York State Adjutant General Charles W. Berry, and William A. Saxton of the War Records Bureau. The decision was published in the State of New York Annual Report of The Adjutant General For the year 1919 under Brigadier General Charles W. Berry, The Adjutant General:

World War State Service Medals

New York was one of 16 states that award service medals for World War I. New York was not among the 6 states that issued medals for World War II.

WWII Service Medal

The World War I medal is the only World War service medal issued by New York State.

While a World War II medal was authorized by the state legislature on April 4, 1945, and a prototype medal was created, no medals were issued due to cost to issue the award to the large number of New York veterans and total cost of the medals. It was decided that the Federal awards would be adequate. The prototype designs for New York State appear to have been modified and sold as local WWII medals for veterans of Utica, New York, and South Fork, Pennsylvania.

References 

1919 establishments in New York (state)
Aftermath of World War I
Awards established in 1919
Military awards and decorations of World War I
Military in New York (state)
United States service medals